Claviers is a commune in the Var department in the Provence-Alpes-Côte d'Azur region in southeastern France.

History
Like much of France, there is evidence of the Roman presence during the early part of the past millennium.  There can be seen evidence of Gallo-Roman occupation south of Claviers.

See also
Communes of the Var department

References

Communes of Var (department)